Lactuca pulchella, known as blue lettuce, common blue lettuce, or wild blue lettuce, is a North American flowering plant in the sunflower family, Asteraceae. Some authors place it as a subspecies or variety of a broader concept of Lactuca tatarica, while others consider L. tatarica to occur only in Europe and Asia. Lactuca pulchella (with L. tatarica and others) is commonly separated into the genus Mulgedium, as Mulgedium pulchellum.

Uses
Among the Zuni people of New Mexico in the southwestern United States, the dried root gum of Lactuca pulchella has been used as chewing gum.

References

pulchella
Flora of North America